Durand Eastman Park is a  park located partly in Rochester, and partly in Irondequoit, New York.  It is administered by the Monroe County Parks Department under agreements with the City of Rochester and the Town of Irondequoit.

Geography 
The  park contains several lakes; the two largest are Durand Lake and Eastman Lake. The most commonly used parts of the park are within Rochester; the more remote areas are part of Irondequoit. The park is almost completely surrounded by Irondequoit, and is connected to Rochester by an easement.

History 
At the turn of the century, Dr. Henry S. Durand owned a summer camp in Irondequoit. He and his friend George Eastman saw a need for a public park in the area, and towards this end, bought a number of farms around the Durand property. On January 28, 1907, they offered their land to the city of Rochester, "to be used as a public park forever, a tract of land of about 484 acres situate in the Town of Irondequoit on Lake Ontario", thus giving the common citizen rights to nearly a mile of public beach and adjacent lands on the Lake's shoreline. One year later the land was transferred to the city.

Durand-Eastman Park was formally dedicated on May 22, 1909. Historically, the beach at Durand-Eastman was much wider than it is today.  In 1915, bath houses were built on the lakeshore.  They became unusable in 1949 due to rising water levels.  The buildings were eventually demolished. There once was a zoo in the park, home to as many as 115 animals of the "hoof-stock" variety, such as buffalo, elk, deer, and goats. Opened in 1912 with private funds provided by Alexander Lamberton, then head of the parks commission, the zoo closed in 1962.

In 1961, the City of Rochester made a 99-year agreement with the County of Monroe to maintain, administer and regulate Durand-Eastman Park.  This agreement was later modified in 1975, but forms the basis for Durand-Eastman being a county park.  In 2001, the City of Rochester sold the  along the western edge of Durand-Eastman Park, commonly known as Camp Eastman, to the Town of Irondequoit. The city remains responsible for maintenance of the park's beach.

Flora and fauna 

Durand-Eastman Park has a variety of trees and wildflowers.  A 1937 source claims that the park "contains 395 varieties of native and foreign trees, shrubs, and plants." The park's Slavin Arboretum contains an impressive collection of trees.

Deer, raccoon, groundhogs, eastern gray squirrels, turkey, and chipmunks are common animals in the park.

Recreation and facilities
The park has a municipal golf course, built as a 9-hole course in 1917, that was redesigned by Robert Trent Jones in 1933. Now it has 18 holes and a club house. There are hiking trails. Swimming was permitted at the park's Lake Ontario beach in 2006 for the first time in forty years. The beach is staffed by lifeguards, groundspeople, and security personnel.

References

External links 

 Monroe County Parks Department Page
 City of Rochester page

Geography of Rochester, New York
Parks in Monroe County, New York
Tourist attractions in Rochester, New York